The Robin R.1180 Aiglon is a French four-seat touring and training monoplane designed and built by Avions Robin.

Development
The Aiglon is an all-metal low-wing monoplane with a fixed tricycle landing gear and powered by a nose-mounted 180 hp (134 kW) Lycoming O-360-A3AD or a Lycoming O-360-A3A engine. It was based on the early HR100 but had a lighter airframe and new fin and rudder. The prototype first flew on 25 March 1977 and the production version with detail improvements was certified on 19 September 1978.

Variants
R.1180 Aiglon
Prototype, one built
R.1180T Aiglon
Production variant with longer cabin side windows, 30 built
R.1180TD Aiglon II
A R.1180T with a new instrument panel, improved cabin furnishing and an external baggage locker, 36 built

Specifications (R.1180)

See also

References

Notes

Bibliography
 

1970s French civil utility aircraft
Aiglon
Single-engined tractor aircraft
Low-wing aircraft
Aircraft first flown in 1977